Mecas confusa is a species of longhorned beetles found in the United States and Mexico. It was described by Chemsak and Linsley in 1973.

References

Saperdini
Beetles described in 1973